Carlo Maserati (1881 in Voghera – 1910) was an Italian bicycle and automotive engineer, and the eldest of the Maserati Brothers.

His engineering career started in a bicycle factory in Affori, near Milan, where he developed a one-cylinder internal combustion engine for motorized bicycles. The engine went into production at Marquis Michele Carcano di Anzano del Parcos factory, using a leather strap as transmission. Carlo was engaged as a racer of these bicycles, winning the Brescia-Orzinuovi (1899), Brescia-Cremona-Mantua-Verona-Brescia and Padova-Bovolenta (1900).

Carcanos factory ended in 1901, and Carlo worked as test driver for Fiat (1901–1903), then as test driver and mechanic at Isotta Fraschini (1903) where he was joined by brother Alfieri Maserati. He moved to work on automobiles for Bianchi (motorcycles) (1907), where he raced the Coppa Florio (9th) and the Kaiserpreis, before becoming manager of the Junior car company (1908). At Junior, he hired his brother Ettore Maserati. Carlo died of tuberculosis (1910) and his brothers established Maserati in Bologna (1914).

References

Carlo
Maserati people
Italian automotive engineers
Italian automotive pioneers
1881 births
1910 deaths
People from Voghera
Formula One engineers
Italian founders of automobile manufacturers